Kennedia retrorsa is a species of flowering plant in the family Fabaceae and is endemic to New South Wales. It is a climbing herb with trifoliate leaves and pinkish-purple or scarlet flowers.

Description
Kennedia retrorsa is a vigorous climbing herb covered with rust-coloured or white hairs.

Taxonomy
Kennedia retrorsa was first formally described in 1907 by William Hemsley in Curtis's Botanical Magazine from specimens raised in Kew Gardens from seed "received from the Sydney Botanic Garden". The specific epithet (retrorsa) means "pointing backwards".

Distribution and habitat
This kennedia is only known from the Goulburn River National Park where it grows in cool, damp and rocky places in a range of habitats, usually in sandy soil.

Conservation status
Kennedia retrorsa is listed as "vulnerable" under the Australian Government Environment Protection and Biodiversity Conservation Act 1999 and the New South Wales Government ''Biodiversity Conservation Act 2016.

References

retrorsa
Fabales of Australia
Flora of New South Wales
Plants described in 1907
Taxa named by William Hemsley (botanist)